Chelleh Khaneh or Cheleh Khaneh or Chellehkhaneh, also rendered as Chilakhana, may refer to:
 Chelleh Khaneh, Sarab
 Chelleh Khaneh-ye Olya, Shabestar County
 Chelleh Khaneh-ye Sofla, Shabestar County
 Chelleh Khaneh Rural District, in Shabestar County